The Canadian Rockies are a segment of the North American Rocky Mountains found in the Canadian provinces of Alberta and British Columbia.

List of ranges
There is no universally accepted hierarchical division of the Canadian Rockies into subranges. For ease of navigation only, this article follows and divides the Canadian Rockies into Far Northern Rockies, Northern Continental Ranges, Central Main Ranges, Central Front Ranges and Southern Continental Ranges, each of these subdivided in distinct areas and ranges.

From north to south and west to east, these mountain ranges are:

Far Northern Rockies

The Far Northern Rockies lie in British Columbia, and run from Prince George almost to the Yukon border.
 Muskwa Ranges
 Akie Range
 Battle of Britain Range
 Deserters Range
 Gataga Ranges
 Rabbit Plateau
 Sentinel Range
 Stone Range
 Terminal Range
 Tochieka Range
 Tower of London Range
 Truncate Range
 Hart Ranges
Misinchinka Ranges (from Peace Arm - Williston Reservoir south to Monkman Pass
Murray Range
Pioneer Range
Solitude Range
Dezaiko Range

Northern Continental Ranges

The Northern Continental Ranges run along the British Columbia-Alberta border north from Jasper to Mount Sir Alexander.
Rainbow Range
Victoria Cross Ranges
Northern Front ranges
Starlight Range
Persimmon Range
Berland Range
De Smet Range
Bosche Range
Boule Range

Central Main Ranges

The Central Main (or Park) Ranges lie northeast of the Rocky Mountain Trench, from Golden to Valemount.
 Selwyn Range
 South Jasper Ranges
 The Ramparts Range
 Trident Range
 Winston Churchill Range in Jasper National Park
 Southwest Central Park ranges
 Blackwater Range
 Van Horne Range
 Waputik Mountains
 Waputik Range
 President Range in Yoho National Park

Central Front Ranges

The Central Front Ranges lie northeast of the Rocky Mountain Trench, from Banff to Jasper.
 East Jasper ranges
 Colin Range
 Fiddle Range
 Miette Range
 Jacques Range
 Maligne Range
 Queen Elizabeth Ranges in Jasper National Park
 Nikanassin Range
 Ram Range
 Sawback Range in SE Banff NP
 Slate Range in Banff National Park
 Vermillion Range
 East Banff ranges
 Bare Range
 Palliser Range in the SE corner of Banff NP
 Fairholme Range (in the Bow River valley)

Southern Continental Ranges

The Southern Continental Ranges run along the British Columbia-Alberta border from Banff down to Fernie
 Kootenay Ranges
 Beaverfoot Range, NE of uppermost Columbia River valley
 Brisco Range
 Stanford Range
 Van Nostrand Range
Banff-Lake Louise Core Area
 Ottertail Range
 Vermilion Range
 Ten Peaks Range
 Ball Range in Kootenay National Park
 Massive Range
Assiniboine Area
 Mitchell Range
 Blue Range in Banff National Park
South Banff Ranges
Sundance Range
Kananaskis Country
Kananaskis Range
Fisher Range
Opal Range
Spray Mountains
Elk Range (BC and Alberta)
High Rock Range
Misty Range
Livingstone Range
Crowsnest Ranges
 Lizard Range near Fernie, British Columbia, and in the Elk Valley
 Flathead Range
 Blairmore Range, east of Blairmore, Alberta
Clark Range on the Continental Divide

See also

List of mountains of Alberta
List of mountains of British Columbia
List of mountains of Canada

References

External links

Peakfinder

 
Canadian Rockies
Canadian Rockies, Lists of mountain ranges of